Serine/threonine-protein phosphatase 5 is an enzyme that in humans is encoded by the PPP5C gene.

Model organisms				

Model organisms have been used in the study of PPP5C function. A conditional knockout mouse line, called Ppp5ctm1a(EUCOMM)Wtsi was generated as part of the International Knockout Mouse Consortium program — a high-throughput mutagenesis project to generate and distribute animal models of disease to interested scientists.

Male and female animals underwent a standardized phenotypic screen to determine the effects of deletion. Twenty five tests were carried out on mutant mice and five significant abnormalities were observed. Homozygous mutant males had decreased body weight, body length and respiratory quotient. Both sexes had increased T cell numbers and a range of skeletal abnormalities identified by radiography.

Interactions 

PPP5C has been shown to interact with ASK1, CRY2 GNA12. and Rac1,

References

Further reading 

 
 
 
 
 
 
 
 
 
 
 
 
 
 
 
 
 
 
 
 
 

Genes mutated in mice